Adolf Beck (1 January 1863, Kraków – August 1942, Lwów) was a Polish physician of and professor of physiology at the University of Lwów.

He was born on 1 January 1863, in Kraków, Galicia, into a poor Jewish family. During his academic career, Beck supported himself as a private tutor. Upon graduating with distinction from the gymnasium of his native city in 1884, he entered the Jagiellonian University in Kraków. In 1888, while still a medical student, Beck gained the prize of the university by a paper on the excitability of a nerve, afterward published under the title, "O pobudliwości różnych miejsc tego samego nerwu" (On the Excitability of a Nerve at Different Points). In 1890 he received the degree of M.D., and in the same year published the results of his extensive research on electrical processes in the brain. His papers on this subject, "Die Bestimmung der Localisation des Gehirn- und Rückenmarksfunctionen Vermittelst der Electrischen Erscheinungen," 1890, and "Weitere Untersuchungen über die Electrischen Erscheinungen des Hirnrinde der Affen und Hunde," 1891 (in collaboration with Napoleon Cybulski), attracted wide attention in Germany, France, and England, and won for him a prominent position among students of physiology.

In 1889 Beck was appointed assistant in the physiological laboratory of the Jagiellonian University and he remained in this position until 1894, when he became privatdocent on the presentation of his thesis "Ueber die Physiologie der Reflexes." In the following year he was offered a chair of physiology as associate professor in the newly created medical department of the University of Lemberg and in 1897 was appointed professor in the same institution.

Beck is considered one of the pioneers of electroencephalography (EEG).

Beck has received many marks of distinction from medical societies in recognition of his scientific investigations. His numerous contributions, published in German and in Polish, belong almost exclusively to the domain of physiology. To the investigations represented by these publications should be added the extensive work of research conducted on similar lines in the Physiological Institute of the University of Lemberg under Beck's immediate supervision.

Beck was a member of the Polish Academy of Learning in Kraków. He was the first physiologist awarded with the Medal and a title of an Honorary Member of the Polish Physiological Society (Polskie Towarzystwo Fizjologiczne).

He committed suicide in August 1942 in the Janowska concentration camp.

Works
 "Researches on the Sense of Taste in a Tongueless Human Being" (with Napoleon Cybulski) (in Polish) 1887
 "Die Ströme der Nervencentren," 1890
 "On the Present State of the Theory of Localizing the Functions of the Brain," (in Polish), 1892
 "Hermann Helmholtz " 1894
 "On the Vital Processes and Methods for Their Investigation," (in Polish), 1895; with Cybulski
 "Further Investigations on the Electrical Processes in the Brain" (in Polish), 1896
 "Dreams and Their Causes" in Polish, 1896
 "Die Erregbarkeit Verschiedener Nervenstellen" 1897
 "Zur Untersuchung der Erregbarkeit der Nerven" 1898
 "On Color-Blindness, Artificially Produced," in Polish and in German, 1899.
 "Zur Lehre Munk's über Beginn und Reihenfolge in der Ausbreitung der Bewegungen bei Rückenmarksreflexen, wie bei Tätigkeit der sogenannten „Prinzipalzentren“" 1910 (with Gustav Bikeles)
 "Die sogenannten Berührungsreflexe Munk's und die reflektorische Zehenbeugung bei Reizung der Fusssohle" 1910 (with Gustav Bikeles).

References 

1863 births
1942 deaths
Polish physiologists
Austrian physiologists
Austro-Hungarian Jews
Jagiellonian University alumni
Academic staff of the University of Lviv
Polish Austro-Hungarians
Jews from Galicia (Eastern Europe)
Physicians from Kraków
20th-century Polish people
1942 suicides
People who died in Janowska concentration camp
Suicides by Jews during the Holocaust
Polish Jews who died in the Holocaust
Suicides in Poland